Reynoldsburg is a city in Fairfield, Franklin, and Licking counties in the U.S. state of Ohio. It is a suburban community in the Columbus, Ohio metropolitan area. The population was 41,076 at the 2020 census.

History
Reynoldsburg was originally called Frenchtown, and under the latter name was platted in 1831 by John French, and named for him. The present name is for John C. Reynolds, a local merchant. A post office called Reynoldsburgh was established in 1833, and the name was changed to Reynoldsburg in 1893.

Reynoldsburg is known as "The Birthplace of the Tomato", claiming the first commercial variety of tomato was bred there in the 19th century. and the Tomato Festival has been held every year since 1965. Every year there is a Tomato Festival Queen. The Tomato Festival takes place in August.

Geography
Blacklick Creek flows through Reynoldsburg.

Demographics

2010 census
As of the census of 2010, there were 35,893 people, 14,387 households, and 9,551 families living in the city. The racial makeup of the city was 69.7% White or European American, 23.3% African American, 0.2% Native American, 1.8% Asian, 0.1% Pacific Islander, 1.3% from other races, and 3.5% from two or more races. Hispanic or Latino of any race were 3.4% of the population.

There were 14,387 households, of which 35.3% had children under the age of 18 living with them, 45.8% were married couples living together, 15.9% had a female householder with no husband present, 4.7% had a male householder with no wife present, and 33.6% were non-families. 28.0% of all households were made up of individuals, and 9.3% had someone living alone who was 65 years of age or older. The average household size was 2.49 and the average family size was 3.06.

The median age in the city was 37.3 years. 26.3% of residents were under the age of 18; 8.1% were between the ages of 18 and 24; 26.8% were from 25 to 44; 27.3% were from 45 to 64; and 11.6% were 65 years of age or older. The gender makeup of the city was 47.4% male and 52.6% female.

2000 census
As of the census of 2000, there were 32,069 people, 12,849 households, and 8,801 families living in the city. The population density was 3,030.0 people per square mile (1,170.3/km). There were 13,434 housing units at an average density of 1,269.3 per square mile (490.3/km). The racial makeup of the city was 85.01% White, 10.44% African American, 1.07% Native American, 1.69% Asian, 0.05% Pacific Islander, 0.74% from other races, and 1.81% from two or more races. Hispanic or Latino of any race were 1.80% of the population.

There were 11,109 households, out of which 34.8% had children under the age of 18 living with them, 52.8% were married couples living together, 12.3% had a female householder with no husband present, and 31.5% were non-families. 25.8% of all households were made up of individuals, and 7.2% had someone living alone who was 65 years of age or older. The average household size was 2.49 and the average family size was 3.01.

In the city, the population was spread out, with 26.6% under the age of 18, 8.0% from 18 to 24, 31.9% from 25 to 44, 23.4% from 45 to 64, and 10.1% who were 65 years of age or older. The median age was 35 years. For every 100 females, there were 91.0 males. For every 100 females age 18 and over, there were 87.0 males.

The median income for a household in the city was $51,108, and the median income for a family was $60,183. Males had a median income of $40,608 versus $30,448 for females. The per capita income for the city was $23,388. About 4.4% of families and 5.5% of the population were below the poverty line, including 7.9% of those under age 18 and 4.4% of those age 65 or over.

Government

The City Parks and Recreation Department is responsible for 275 acres of parkland including nine major parks. Established in 1948 the first Franklin County Metro Park opened in Reynoldsburg, Blacklick Woods and Blacklick Woods Golf Course; a 643-acre park with Golf, several multi purpose trails, one of the oldest Beech-maple forest in central Ohio, a winter sledding hill, a Nature Center and the Walter A. Tucker State Nature Preserve located inside Blacklick Woods.

The Reynoldsburg Division of Police, with a total of 70 sworn officers, 21 civilians, and 12 reserve police officers, is located next to City Hall. The agency currently has a Motor Unit (with four cycles), a Canine Unit (with two dogs), a Special Investigations Unit, a Criminal Investigations Unit, School Resource Officers (two), Community Resource Officers (two located at sub-stations), bicycle officers, a Dispatch Center, and fields a joint SWAT team with Whitehall Police. RPD has been an innovator in central Ohio. The agency's primary community outreach program is its Illumination Project, borrowed from the City of Charleston Police Department. Each month, the RPD hosts a Q&A sessions with the chief or other officials. RPD was the first agency in central Ohio to begin a security camera registration program, allowing RPD detectives to quickly ascertain potential leads. Other changes implemented in 2019 include a cold case review, body worn cameras, a bias analysis, and a lateral hiring program.
The City Auditor, Stephen M. Cicak and City Attorney Christopher M. Shook

The Ohio Department of Agriculture, the Ohio Fire Academy, and the Office of the Ohio State Fire Marshal are also located in Reynoldsburg.

Parks 
Civic Park - 6800 Daugherty Dr | Huber Park - 1640 Davidson Dr | JFK Park - 7232 E Main St | Old Rodebaugh Park - 7300 Rodebaugh Rd | New Rodebaugh Park - 8020 Rodebaugh Rd | Pine Quarry Park - 8000 Kingsley Dr | Blacklick Woods Metro Park - 6975 E Livingston Ave

Schools 
The majority of Reynoldsburg is in the Reynoldsburg City School District.

The Reynoldsburg school district currently has six elementary schools, four middle or junior high schools and one high school with two campuses. The high school and junior high schools' mascot is Rocky Raider (a pirate) and its colors are purple and gold.

Elementary (K-4)

Herbert Mills(6826 Retton Rd) Rose Hill(760 Rosehill Rd) French Run(1200 Epworth Ave) Taylor(8200 Taylor Road) Slate Ridge(10466 Taylor Road SW) Summit(8591 Summit Rd)

Middle(5-8)

Hannah Ashton(1482 Jackson St) Baldwin(2300 Baldwin Pl) Waggoner Middle(340 South Waggoner Rd) Waggoner Junior(360 South Waggoner Rd)

High(9-12)

Livingston - BELL & HS2(6699 E Livingston Ave) Summit - Encore & eSTEM(8579 Summit Rd)

Economy
According to the city's 2021 Independent Audit Report, the top employers in the city are:

Notable people

 Aman Ali, comedian and storyteller
 Le'Veon Bell, football player for Michigan State and Kansas City Chiefs
 Calvin Booth, former professional basketball player who currently serves as the general manager of the Denver Nuggets
 Ashton Dulin, football player for Malone University and Indianapolis colts
 Eric Fryer, Major League Baseball catcher for St. Louis Cardinals
 Mike Matheny, St. Louis Cardinals manager and three-time MLB Golden Glove winner
 Shad Gregory Moss, rapper and actor, known by his stage name "Bow Wow"

References

External links

 City website
 Reynoldsburg Visitors and Community Activities Bureau
 Reynoldsburg Area Chamber of Commerce official site

Cities in Ohio
Cities in Franklin County, Ohio
Cities in Fairfield County, Ohio
Cities in Licking County, Ohio
1831 establishments in Ohio
Populated places established in 1831